Posyolok fermy 3 sovkhoza Dobrinsky is a rural locality (a settlement) in Verkhnedobrinskoye Rural Settlement, Kamyshinsky District, Volgograd Oblast, Russia. The population was 83 as of 2010. There are 3 streets.

Geography 
The settlement is located in steppe, on the Volga Upland, on the west bank of the Volgograd Reservoir, 33 km northeast of Kamyshin (the district's administrative centre) by road. Nagorny is the nearest rural locality.

References 

Rural localities in Kamyshinsky District